Carl Fredrik Christoffer Schander (21 May 1960 – 21 February 2012) was a professor in marine biology at the University of Bergen, Norway.  He was also a thematic leader at the Centre of Excellence in Geobiology. His doctoral thesis (1997, University of Gothenburg, Sweden) explored the evolutionary relationships of the parasitic marine gastropod family Pyramidellidae. He worked on marine invertebrates, mainly molluscs, and published more than 90 scientific papers in peer-reviewed journals, 76 are indexed in the Web of Knowledge, and fourteen of them have been cited ten or more times.

According to his web page, he considered the goal of his research to be understanding the roles that evolutionary forces and phylogeny have played in creating organismal diversity. To help develop this understanding, he used phylogenetic analyses that integrated morphological, ultrastructural and molecular data. His research focused on molluscs and more specifically on the ectoparasitic pyramidellid gastropods and the, shell-less, primary deep-sea aplacophorans, the biogeography of these animals, and the relationship between the molluscs and other animal groups.

In addition to taxonomy and systematics, he published several papers on the use of formalin fixed tissue for molecular studies. He was active in the DNA barcoding community.

The World Register of Marine Species mentions 33 new gastropod species named by Schander

Personal life 
Schander was born in Sweden in 1960. He lived in his home town of Borås and became one of the most active Swedish science fiction fans in the 1980s, creating fanzines such as Semikolon A & B and I väntan på PEP and the APA Efterapa, and arranging science fiction conventions such as RegnCon in 1981. He died after a short illness on 21 February 2012.

Partial bibliography 

  
 
 
 
 
 
 
 
 
 
  
 
  
 
 
  PDF.

External links
Christoffer Schander
"Direktør ved Universitetsmuseet Christoffer Schander er død" Universitetsmuseet i Bergen website; 21 February 2012
The aplacophora homepage

References

Swedish malacologists
Swedish marine biologists
Swedish emigrants to Norway
Academic staff of the University of Bergen
Scientists from Bergen
People from Borås
1960 births
2012 deaths